William Frülich of Soleure ( 1504 – 4 December 1562; Wilhelm Frölich in German) was a Swiss military leader; he was the commander of the Swiss mercenaries in French service at the Battle of Ceresole.

References

 Oman, Charles. A History of the Art of War in the Sixteenth Century.  London: Methuen & Co., 1937.

1562 deaths
Military personnel from Zürich
Frulich, William of Soleure
Swiss mercenaries
Year of birth uncertain